Eloisa Marcos (born 15 January 1962) is a Spanish gymnast. She competed in five events at the 1976 Summer Olympics.

References

1962 births
Living people
Spanish female artistic gymnasts
Olympic gymnasts of Spain
Gymnasts at the 1976 Summer Olympics
Sportspeople from Asturias